Lui Muavesi (born 25 February 1966) is a Fijian former middle-distance runner. He competed in the men's 800 metres at the 1988 Summer Olympics.

References

External links

1966 births
Living people
Athletes (track and field) at the 1988 Summer Olympics
Fijian male middle-distance runners
Olympic athletes of Fiji
Place of birth missing (living people)
20th-century Fijian people
21st-century Fijian people